Arthur Thomas Brown (April 20, 1900 – October 24, 1993) was an American architect who is remembered as “Tucson’s pioneer of solar design.”

Biography 

Brown was born in Tarkio, Missouri, and studied at Ohio State University, graduating in 1927.  He worked at the Century of Progress exposition in Chicago in 1932 and 1933. Both a fine art painter and trained architect, Brown arrived in Tucson in 1936 and opened his own architectural firm by 1941. He was a member of the exclusive Tucson Palette and Brush Club and the Tucson Fine Arts Association. He is recognized as a "pioneer" in the development of passive solar heating and passive cooling.

His buildings have only recently gained recognition. Many of his works have been lost including: Tucson General Hospital, Tucson Biltmore Motor Hotel and Tucson's Carnegie Free Library (Tucson Children's Museum) wall.  His residential projects are scattered throughout Tucson's post World War II mid-century expansion district.

Many of his buildings remain in Tucson including: the First Christian Church at 740 E. Speedway Boulevard, Faith Lutheran Church, 5th street. Delectables Restaurant on N 4th Avenue is also Brown's. It was built in 1945 for the Ingham and Ingham Harley-Davidson dealership. The changes made were primarily interior.  He also designed the RON-Tel Hotel ("remain over-night" hotel for pilots) at Tucson International Airport, remodeled in 1976 as airport personnel offices, and a newly demolished (late 2016) airport restaurant, The Tower Grill, which showcased Brown's imaginative "folded plate" roofline.

Buildings
 1946: Rosenberg House (Tucson)
 1947: Clifford Goldsmith House (Tucson)
 1948: Rose Elementary School (Tucson)
 1949: Hirsch house (Tucson)
 1950: Ball-Paylore House (Tucson)
 1952: Tucson Chamber of Commerce building
 1953: G.C. Trego house
 1956: 4535 N. Osage Drive, Edmonson house (Tucson)
 1959: 2928 N Orlando Avenue (Tucson)
 1963–70: Tucson General Hospital (later destroyed)
 1966: 4315 N. La Linda Rama (Tucson)

Awards and honors
 American Institute of Architects College of Fellows (FAIA), 1961

Patents

References

 Wayne, Kathryn M., Arthur T. Brown, FAIA, Vance Bibliographies, 1987.
 Tucson Home Magazine, Arthur T. Brown, Architects of Influence, 2008.

External links
 

1900 births
1993 deaths
Architects from Arizona
Artists from Tucson, Arizona
Architecture firms based in Arizona
Art Deco architects
Ohio State University alumni
Solar building designers
20th-century American architects
Architects from Tucson, Arizona
Fellows of the American Institute of Architects